P Se Pyaar F Se Faraar  is a 2019 Indian Hindi-language drama film directed by Manoj Tiwari and produced by Jogender Singh under the banner Ok Movies. It features  Bhavesh Kumar, who marks his debut in the film, and stars Jimmy Sheirgill, Sanjay Mishra, Girish Kulkarni, Zakir Hussain, Akhilendra Mishra and Kumud Mishra. The story is based upon Article 15 of the Constitution of India, which prohibits discrimination on grounds of religion, race, caste, sex or place of birth, and Article 19, which deals with freedom of thought and expression.

The first look of the film was released on 28 Aug 2019 as a motion poster by OK Movies. The film was released on
18 October 2019.

Cast
Source - 
  Bhavesh Kumar as Sooraj Mali
 Jimmy Sheirgill as Rajveer Singh
 Kumud Mishra as Omveer Singh
 Sanjay Mishra as Mr. Inquiry
 Girish Kulkarni as Rajesh
 Zakir Hussain as Coach Saheb
 Akhilendra Mishra as Benia
 Smita Singh as Omveers wife
 Brijendra Kala as Police Constable
 Pankaj Jha as Pankaj Singh
 Neha Joshi as Mallika
 Asif Basra as Sompal Singh
 Seema Azmi as Gouri Malan
 Anuja Jha as Meena
 Shivani Sapori as Amma Ji
 Ehsan Khan as Sandeep
Jacynthe Cauvier as Foreign Musician
Bhavesh Kumar as Sonu
Jyoti Yadav as Jhanvi

Marketing and release
The first look of the film in a motion poster was unveiled by OK Movies & Music on 28 August 2019. 

The film was released on 18 October 2019 worldwide, through PVR Pictures.

Soundtrack

The music of the film is composed by 
Ripul Sharma. Song "Ishq Kalandar" is composed by Sanjeev - Ajay and lyrics by Sanjeev Chaturvedi. Other lyrics are written by Ripul Sharma, Vipul Ghangale, Milind Gadhavi and Buddha Mukherjee.

References

External links
 
 

2019 films
Films about the caste system in India
Films about social issues in India
Films set in Uttar Pradesh
Indian films based on actual events
Drama films based on actual events